Víctor Hugo Ávalos Acosta (6 November 1971 – 2 April 2009) was a Paraguayan footballer most remembered for his spells at Quilmes, Independiente Medellín and in Chilean football. Mainly a central midfielder who could also operate as an attacking playmaker, he died in 2009 from a heart attack during an amateur football game.

Club career
Born in the capital Asunción, Ávalos joined hometown's Club Cerro Corá, growing up at the club's football academy and making his Primera División debut in 1990, aged 19.

Quilmes
His style of play caught the attention of Argentine Primera División side Quilmes Atlético Club, and he went on to play all the games of the 1991–92 season for the Buenos Aires-based outfit, with Nelson Vivas as teammate.

Independiente Medellín
The next season Ávalos joined Independiente Medellín of Colombia, playing 36 matches and scoring three goals.

Olimpia Asunción
In 1994, Ávalos joined Primera División Paraguaya and Copa Libertadores team Olimpia Asunción, in a team with Jorge Luis Campos, Jose Cardozo, Casiano Delvalle, Gabriel Gonzalez, Harles Bourdier, Celso Ayala, Virginio Caceres, Jorge Battaglia and Ricardo Tavarelli. During the Copa Libertadores of the same season, Ávalos scored 1 goal in 5 games.

The team won the Primera División title in 1995.

Tembetary
In 1996, Ávalos joined Atlético Tembetary, featuring for the side with goalkeeper Dario Espinola and Uruguayan Darwin Quintana. Whilst at Tembetary, Ávalos became a national team player.

Guaraní
In 1997 Ávalos joined Club Guaraní, eventually being club captain. Ávalos made 3 appearances for Guaraní in the 1998 Copa Libertadores.

12 de Octubre
In 2000, Ávalas joined 12 de Octubre de Itaguá, where he had as teammates Salvador Cabañas, Dario Veron and Elvis Marecos. For the following season at 12 de Octubre, Ávalos was joined in the team by Fredy Bareiro.

Deportes Temuco
In January 2004, aged 32, he arrived at Deportes Temuco of the Chilean Primera División, going on to remain the vast majority of his remaining career in the country, representing in quick succession C.D. Universidad de Concepción, Deportes Puerto Montt, C.D.P. Curicó Unido and Santiago Wanderers of Valparaíso (playing seventeen 2007 Apertura games for the latter club) and having also appeared for C.D.F.A. Arturo Fernández Vial in the Primera B.

Silvio Pettirossi
In 2008, Ávalas played for Club Silvio Pettirossi. Avalos amassed a total of 15 appearances for Silvio Pettirossi during the 2008 season.

Villa Florida
In 2009, Ávalos joined local team Villa Florida.

International career
Ávalos was capped once by the Paraguayan national side, on 14 February 1996 against Bolivia. He replaced Club Atlético Independiente's Roberto Acuña in the 52nd minute of a 1–4 away friendly loss prior to the 1998 FIFA World Cup qualifiers.

Additionally, Ávalos played four times for the U-20s in 1991, competing in the South American Youth Championship in Venezuela.

Statistics

Club

Country

Honours
Olimpia
 Primera División: 1995

Death
On 2 April 2009, during his debut at Paraguayan amateur club Villa Florida, Ávalos scored a goal against Salesianito in San Vicente (Asunción). During the subsequent celebrations, he suffered a heart attack, being afflicted by several cardiac arrests, dying at the age of 37.

Weeks later, Ávalos' former club Deportes Temuco made him a tribute match, which featured players as strikers Lucas Barrios and César Díaz, as well as Sergio Bernabé Vargas, historic goalkeeper of the Chilean football team.

See also
List of association footballers who died while playing

References

External links

1971 births
2009 deaths
Sportspeople from Asunción
Paraguayan footballers
Association football midfielders
Cerro Corá footballers
Club Olimpia footballers
Club Guaraní players
12 de Octubre Football Club players
Club Presidente Hayes footballers
Club Tacuary footballers
Quilmes Atlético Club footballers
Independiente Medellín footballers
Deportes Temuco footballers
Universidad de Concepción footballers
Puerto Montt footballers
Curicó Unido footballers
Santiago Wanderers footballers
C.D. Arturo Fernández Vial footballers
Argentine Primera División players
Paraguayan Primera División players
Categoría Primera A players
Primera B de Chile players
Chilean Primera División players
Paraguay international footballers
Paraguay under-20 international footballers
Paraguayan expatriate footballers
Expatriate footballers in Argentina
Expatriate footballers in Colombia
Expatriate footballers in Chile